Clinical and Applied Thrombosis/Hemostasis is a peer-reviewed medical journal covering research in the field of hematology. The editor-in-chief is Charles A. Carter, PharmD, MBA. It was established in 1995 and is currently published by SAGE Publications.

Abstracting and indexing 
Clinical and Applied Thrombosis/Hemostasis is abstracted and indexed in Scopus and the Social Sciences Citation Index. According to the Journal Citation Reports, its 2017 impact factor is 1.852, ranking it 46th out of 65 journals in the category "Peripheral Vascular Disease" and 52nd out of 71 journals in the category "Hematology".

References

External links 
 

SAGE Publishing academic journals
English-language journals
Hematology journals
Bimonthly journals
Publications established in 1995